Sid-Ahmed Bouziane (born 18 July 1983 in Quetigny, Dijon) is a French footballer who is currently playing for FC Thun in the Swiss Challenge League.

External links
 his website
 Official Facebook Page

1983 births
Living people
Footballers from Bourgogne-Franche-Comté
French footballers
FC Chiasso players
Servette FC players
FC Thun players
Expatriate footballers in Italy
Expatriate footballers in Switzerland
Association football midfielders
Sportspeople from Dijon
French sportspeople of Algerian descent
Serie B players
A.S.D. SolbiaSommese Calcio players
French expatriate footballers
French expatriate sportspeople in Italy
French expatriate sportspeople in Switzerland